The 1988 United States Senate election in Virginia was held on November 8, 1988. Democratic former governor Chuck Robb succeeded Republican Senator Paul Trible, who opted not to run for re-election. , this is the last time a Democratic Senatorial candidate won every county and independent city in Virginia.

Candidates

Democratic 
 Chuck Robb, former Governor of Virginia

Republican 
 Maurice A. Dawkins, minister and black activist

Results

See also 

  1988 United States Senate elections

References 

Virginia
1988
United States Senate